The Bristol International Comic & Small Press Expo, commonly known as Comic Expo or BCE, was an annual comic book convention held in the United Kingdom from 2004 to 2013. The show was held once a year in Bristol in the spring. The organiser was Mike Allwood, formerly of Area 51, a comic shop based in Bristol.

The convention featured floorspace for exhibitors, including comic book dealers and collectibles merchants. Along with panels, seminars, and workshops with comic book professionals, one of the highlights of Comic Expo was the Orang Utan Comics film night, which was a staple of the show since 2007.  The charity event "Draw the World Together" was an annual part of the show. BCE included a separate "Small Press Expo," an autograph area, as well as a so-called "Artists' Alley" where comics artists signed autographs and sold or offered free sketches. Publishers such as Rebellion Publishing, Panini Comics, Markosia, Reed Full Circle, and SelfMadeHero often had presences as well.

From 2004 to 2008, Comic Expo was the host of the Eagle Awards.

History
BCE replaced a previous Bristol-based UK convention, the Comic Festival; retailer Mike Allwood had been involved with managing Comic Festival as well. (Comic Festival itself had been preceded as an annual UK comic book convention by the United Kingdom Comic Art Convention).

The first Comic Expo was held in Bristol on 6–7 November 2004, at the Ramada City Inn. (A so-called "Pro-Con" was held in the same space on 5 November.) Guests included Simon Furman, Mike Carey, and Mike Collins. This was very much a trial run by all concerned. Although not very well attended, it established how future events in Bristol would work.

The next BCE, held in May 2005, was a success, with guests such as J. Michael Straczynski, Michael Avon Oeming, Gary Frank, Dave Gibbons, Alan Davis, Brian Bolland, Mike Ploog and Simon Bisley; as well as over 2,000 attendees. The Just 1 Page charity comic was produced at Comic Expo 2005 and again in 2006 (continuing on from its origins at Comic Festival).

The November 2005 Brighton Comic Expo was held at the prestigious Metropole Hilton, the largest conference hotel in South England. Guests included Mark Millar, Gilbert Shelton, Dave Gibbons, Sydney Jordan, and Harry Harrison. This was again successful and, with the exception of a few minor criticisms, proved immensely popular with those attending.

Comic Expo Bristol 2006 was a success, with early figures suggesting around 2,000 attendees, as well as the presentation of the Eagle Awards.

The 2008 show was the best attended one so far, with more than 4,000 ticket buyers. The Eagle Awards ceremony was held on Saturday, May 10, presented by comedian Fraser Ayres.

The Great Recession hit the 2009 show hard, as only 650 fans attended. The 2012 show attracted only 300 attendees, with many exhibitors reporting losses. Because of this, there was speculation the show might not survive, but attendance increased for the 2013 show. Nonetheless, the final BCE was held in 2014.

Locations and dates

References

External links

Hypotheticals 2008 panel website

Defunct comics conventions
British comics
British fan conventions
Recurring events established in 2004